Andreas "Andy" Krause (born 16 November 1967) is a German former football player and current poker player. He played professionally for the Stuttgarter Kickers from 1990 to 1993, including two caps during a time when the club was in the Bundesliga, and then for 1. FC Pforzheim. He now competes in the World Series of Poker and lives in Weinsberg.

References 

1967 births
Living people
German footballers
German poker players
Stuttgarter Kickers players
1. FC Pforzheim players
Association football defenders